Fraternitas Saturni (lat.: "Brotherhood of Saturn") is a German magical order, founded in 1926 by Eugen Grosche a.k.a. Gregor A. Gregorius and four others. It is one of the oldest continuously running magical groups in Germany. The lodge is, as Gregorius states, "concerned with the study of esotericism, mysticism, and magic in the cosmic sense". The FS adopts a system of degrees, ending with the 33rd as highest degree to reach this goal. The lodge claims further no political or economical objectives. It propagates ideals of freedom, tolerance and fraternity.

The Fraternitas Saturni is essentially Thelemic, in that the order accept the Law of Thelema.

History

Origins: Pansophia Lodge and the Weida Conference 
The Fraternitas Saturni was founded in the wake of the so-called "Weida Conference" in 1925. It succeeded the "Collegium Pansophicum, Orient Berlin" (Pansophia Lodge), a Rosicrucian magical order founded by Heinrich Traenker, a notable German occultist of the time. The Weida Conference was meant to consolidate Aleister Crowley's claims to be the Outer Head of Ordo Templi Orientis and the expected World Teacher. The conference consisted of Crowley's entourage of Leah Hirsig, Dorothy Olsen, and Norman Mudd and the members of Heinrich Traenker's "Pansophia Lodge". Traenker had served as a X° National Grand Master of the German O.T.O. under Theodor Reuss up until Reuss's death. Also attending the conference were the notable film pioneer Albin Grau and Gregor A. Gregorius.

The conference was not a smooth event and Traenker withdrew his support of Crowley. The differences between Traenker and Crowley led to a schism in the Pansophical Lodge between the brothers who disagreed with Crowley and those who accepted Crowley's Law of Thelema, including Gregorius and Grau. Following these differences the Pansophical Lodge would be officially closed in 1926. Those brothers of the Pansophia Lodge who accepted the teachings of Crowley would join Grosche in founding the Fraternitas Saturni - but without Albin Grau.<ref>Tobias Churton. The Beast in Berlin: Art, Sex and Magick in the Weimar Republic. Rochester, VT: Inner Traditions, 2014, pp. 60-68.</ref>

 Founding 
At Easter 1928, the Fraternitas Saturni was officially founded in Berlin. The Lodge made a formal acceptance of the Book of the Law but they would not answer to Crowley. The FS still thought of him as an important teacher and included the Law of Thelema in most of its teachings, while divorcing itself from direct contact with him. This resulted in the FS developing a different take on the idea of Thelema, which is reflected in the rituals and magical techniques of the brotherhood. The emphasis of the FS lies more on astrological and Luciferian teachings, rather than on Qabalah and Tarot compared to other western magical orders founded in the early 20th century. Because of its unique approach to modern occultism, the FS is considered by many modern authors to be the most influential German magical order.

In 1936, the Fraternitas Saturni was prohibited by the Nazi regime. Gregorius as well as other leaders of the lodge emigrated in order to avoid imprisonment, but in the course of the war Grosche was arrested for a year by the Nazi government.

 After World War II 
The end of World War II saw the reactivation of Fraternitas Saturni. First from Riesa in Eastern Germany and later from Berlin, Gregorius tried to contact the Brothers and found lodges in several German cities. By 1957 lodges existed in Düsseldorf, Hamburg, Frankfurt and Stuttgart, with the Grand Lodge in Berlin. In 1960 the FS had, according to its membership list, about 100 members, but in 1962 internal problems led to the expulsion of several members. Following Grosche's death in 1964, the lodge experienced confusion concerning the position of Grandmaster. This resulted in a schism between the Frankfurt lodge and the main body of the Order.
In 1969 the two separate groups of the Fraternitas Saturni were reunified, ending the former conflicts.

 List of grandmasters 
Gregor A. Gregorius (1928–1964) (Eugen Grosche)
Roxane (1964–1965)
Daniel (1966–1969)
Jananda (1969)
Andrzey (1969–1977)
Horus (1977–1978)
Drakon (1978–1982)
Hamupe (1983–1986)
Babacan (1986–1990)
Thot (1990–)

Structure

Development
Originally, there existed eight degrees within the Fraternitas Saturni, not including the Novice, who was not a regular member but a candidate to the Order, and the Grandmaster, which was not a degree in those days but a position held by a single master of the highest degree, guiding the affairs of the lodge. A new member of the Pronaos held the degree of Neophyt (Apprentice), the second degree was called Gradus Mercurii (Journeyman), followed by the Gradus Solis (Master). The first degree in the second order of R + C was called the Gradus Pentalphae, followed by the Gradus Sigilli Salomonis and the Magus Heptagrammatos. The third order called the S. S. G., was formed by the degrees of Templarius, Gnosticus and Magister Aquarius.

The system of degrees was changed in 1960. After the reformation of the degree system and its expansion to 33 degrees, the Gradus Mercurii became 8°, Gradus Solis became 12° and the Gradus Pentalphae became 18°. The other Grades were repositioned as well. The Templarius were renamed Princeps Arcani (24°) and a new degree of Magister Templarius (31°) were installed.

Outline of degree system

 Contents 
In the 1950s, the first two degrees of the Fraternitas Saturni were of theoretical character. The first degree to be attained by work was the Gradus Mercurii (8°). The conditions centered on basic understanding of esoteric principles and a written essay. The second degree to be attained by work was the Gradus Solis (12°), which required a deeper understanding of lodge ritual and two essays. This degree qualified the Initiate to lead a lodge of the FS. Today these degrees require theoretical understanding as well as practical work in the field of occultism.

Another important degree was the Frater (4°), which contained an oath of lifelong commitment. This was later changed and the vow was made part of the attainment of the Gradus Solis. After 1960, the Gradus Solis marked the member as a part of the inner order, the so-called "Grand-Lodge Fraternitas Saturni".

Much speculation has been made around the content of the Gradus Pentalphae (18°), the degree of the pentagram or the five pointed star. As far as it is known, the work of the Gradus Pentalphae was centered on tantric mysticism and sex magic. As many faked documents have been published it is hard to verify the rumors about the contents of this degree.

The Initials of the degree of Gradus Ordinis Templi Orientis Saturni (33°) are similar to the name of the egregore of the lodge - GOTOS.

Current lodges

 Fraternitas Saturni 
The Fraternitas Saturni became a legal organisation, registered as "Fraternitas Saturni, e.v." in 1957. The Fraternitas Saturni is, beside incorporating new attempts on magic, still working on its traditional roots and enhancing the concept of "Saturn-Magic" as the center of its work. On its 75th anniversary (2003), the lodge incorporated another order of the so-called "Immanuel-succession", the "Grand-Lodge Gregor A. Gregorius". This unification effectively doubled the size of its membership. The Fraternitas Saturni claims to  have working lodges in Germany, Austria and Switzerland. There was a branch in Canada (based in Toronto) in the late 1970s. 

Known members

Albin Grau
Eugen Grosche a.k.a. Gregor A. Gregorius
Karl Spiesberger
Ralph Tegtmeier (a.k.a. Frater U∴D∴)

Offshoots

 Ordo Saturni 
In 1979 some brothers left the Fraternitas Saturni to form their own magical order, called the Ordo Saturni. Although the original lodge kept the name by adjudication, Ordo Saturni claims the "true succession" of the order.

 Communitas Saturni 
In 1993 one resigned master ("Immanuel-succession") founded another Saturnian order, the Communitas Saturni, in southern Germany.

See also
Magical organization

References

Literature
θAythos. Die Fraternitas Saturni - Eine saturn-magische Loge. (Hiram-Edition 7. Arbeitsgemeinschaft für Religions- und Weltanschauungsfragen 1979).
Flowers, Stephen. Fire & Ice - The History, Structure and Rituals of Germany's Most Influential Modern Magical Order: The Brotherhood of Saturn. (Llewellyn Publ. 1994) .
Frater Oriphiel. Magische Einweihungspfade. (Bohmeier Verlag 2005) .
Fraternitas Saturni. Blätter für angewandte okkulte Lebenskunst, Bd. 1-13. (Fraternitas Saturni 1950–63).
Fraternitas Saturni. Saturn Gnosis Vol. III, No. 1. (Fraternitas Saturni 2008).
Frater V.D. Die Fraternitas Saturni heute. (Verlag Ralph Tegtmeier Nachf. 1994).
Frater V.D. Schule der Hohen Magie, Bd. 2. (Ansata 2003).
Haack, Friedrich-Wilhelm. Die Fraternitas Saturni (FS) als Beispiel für einen arkan-mystogenen Geheimorden des 20. Jahrhunderts. (Hiram-Edition 1. Arbeitsgemeinschaft für Religions- und Weltanschauungsfragen 1977) .
 Hakl, Hans Thomas. "Fraternitas Saturni", in: Wouter J. Hanegraaff: Dictionary of Gnosis & Western Esotericism. Vol. I. Brill, Leiden 2005, pp. 379–382. 
Hakl, Hans Thomas. "The Magical Order of the Fraternitas Saturni". In: Occultism in a global perspective. Edited by Henrik Bogdan and Gordan Djurdjevic, Durham 2013, p. 37-56,.
Hemberger, Adolf. Der mystisch-magische Orden Fraternitas Saturni, in 2 Bde. Privatdruck.
Popiol, Alexander, Schrader, Raimund. Gregor A. Gregorius - Mystiker des dunklen Lichts''. (Esoterischer Verlag 2007) .

External links
 

 
Esoteric schools of thought
Magical organizations